Frank Ernest Field or Ernest Frank Field (23 September 1874 in Weethley, Warwickshire, England – 25 August 1934 in Droitwich, Worcestershire, England) was a Warwickshire fast bowler who is best remembered for sharing with Frank Foster the bowling honours in Warwickshire's flukish County Championship triumph in the abnormally dry summer of 1911 - the only time any county outside the "Big Six" (Yorkshire, Lancashire, Nottinghamshire, Middlesex, Kent and Surrey) won between 1890 and 1935.

However, aside from this triumph, Field had a long career before Foster even played for Warwickshire. Indeed, if Foster's career was tragic, Field's was in many ways more so, for a succession of serious accidents hampered him at exactly the time he would otherwise have become a top-class fast bowler and a candidate for representative honours.

Field first played for Warwickshire in 1897, but it was only the following year with a tireless 8 for 144 in an innings of 509 against Gloucestershire that he was seen as possibly a major acquisition for the county. Despite occasional setbacks, he advanced rapidly to be Warwickshire's leading bowler in the dry summer of 1899 with 73 wickets for 23 each - a remarkable performance on such true pitches as Edgbaston was then known for. His 12 for 194 against the powerful Surrey batting made many critics believe Field would become England's first-choice fast bowler within a few years. 1900 saw him take 100 wickets for the first time, and he maintained his form through 1901 despite an injury early in the season.

However, the sequence of tragedies that was to ruin Field's career began the following year when extremely wet weather and the slow-drying nature of the Edgbaston ground made Field worthless for most of the season. This was repeated the following year, but his value to the team on hard wickets was already unquestioned. However, the following three mainly fine summers - when his bowling would have been wanted regularly rather than occasionally - were almost entirely wiped out by a succession of injuries and strains. In 1906, indeed, he suffered a heel injury in the first match and did not play again.

Doubts were expressed over Field's capacity to recover from such an appalling series of setbacks, and though he was expensive even when wanted in the wet 1907 summer, 1908 saw Field, despite having little support, have his best season yet highlighted by an impressive performance against Yorkshire (who came closer to losing a match than at any other time that year). However, a disappointing 1909 suggested that Field was past it. And though 1910 saw Field come closer to his best (notably against Yorkshire at Edgbaston when he bowled them out for 125 on a perfect pitch), there was little belief he could survive a full season of dry wickets. All expectations, though were refuted by his consistently excellent work on the lightning fast wickets of 1911, which saw him take 122 wickets in 19 games for 19.48 each - slightly better even than Foster. 

However, again a wet summer where his pace was of no value prevented Field from keeping up his form, and an injury in 1913 at the age of thirty-seven put paid to hopes of Field having another season like 1911. He bowled quite well in 1914 and played a few matches with success in 1919, but was clearly unable at forty-three to bowl a full season at full pace, and he retired the following year.

Field had no pretensions to be a batsman, but at his best was a bowler of considerable pace and capable of a sharp break-back on a worn pitch, as was shown most clearly in Warwickshire's crucial win against Yorkshire at Harrogate in 1911, when he took 7 for 20 to bowl Yorkshire out for 58.

External links

1874 births
1934 deaths
Warwickshire cricketers
English cricket umpires
English cricketers
London County cricketers
North v South cricketers
Players cricketers
Lord Londesborough's XI cricketers
Non-international England cricketers